Operation Kitbag was a raid in Norway by British Commandos of No 6 Commando and No. 12 Commando in December 1941, during the Second World War.

On 9 December 1941 detachments from No. 6 and No. 12 Commandos,  some Norwegian soldiers, took part in a raid on the town of Florø in Norway. During the voyage, while some of the men were priming grenades for the raid, six men were killed and another 11 were seriously wounded. The decision was made to continue with the raid but due to navigational difficulties the operation was eventually called off when the naval commander was unable to locate the fjord upon which Florø was located.

Footnotes

References

 
 

Conflicts in 1941
1941 in Norway
Battles and operations of World War II involving Norway
Military history of Norway during World War II
Norwegian resistance movement
World War II British Commando raids
History of Vestland